Devils Lake station is a train station in Devils Lake, North Dakota. It is served by Amtrak's Empire Builder train, which stops in six other North Dakota cities.

The station was originally built in the early 1900s by the Great Northern Railway and has been a contributing property to the  Devils Lake Commercial District, which has been on the National Register of Historic Places since 1989, along with the Bangs-Wineman Block and the U.S. Post Office and Courthouse.

Station layout

Bibliography

References

External links

Devils Lake Amtrak Station (USA Rail Guide – Train Web)

Amtrak stations in North Dakota
Railway stations in the United States opened in 1893
Former Great Northern Railway (U.S.) stations
Buildings and structures in Ramsey County, North Dakota
Historic district contributing properties in North Dakota
1893 establishments in North Dakota